Richard Faith (March 20, 1926 - February 28, 2021) was an American composer who has been known primarily in university music circles as a concert pianist, professor of piano, and a published composer of piano pedagogy literature, orchestral and chamber works, opera and most prolifically, song. A neo-romantic, Faith has always been first and foremost a melodist.

Biography
Richard Bruce Faith was born in Evansville, Indiana. His mother was a homemaker active in community affairs, and his father, a dentist. Both parents were very supportive of his choice to become a musician as they too came from musical backgrounds. Faith's mother studied piano before her five children were born; his father picked up musical skills without a teacher and played piano, violin and sang in the church choir. Around age eight, Richard began to study piano with his fifteen-year-old cousin and he soon began improvising melodies on the keyboard. Between the ages of eleven and twelve he began writing down his piano compositions, one of which later became a work for women's chorus entitled "Daffodils" (I Wandered Lonely as a Cloud) with poetry by William Wordsworth.

Before his natural bent toward composing could take root and grow, Faith embarked on a career as a concert pianist. In 1940 at age fourteen, he appeared with the Evansville Philharmonic Orchestra, and after a few years of study he entered Chicago Musical College, where he received both undergraduate and master's degrees in piano performance. At age nineteen he placed in a collegiate contest and was given the opportunity to perform in Chicago's Orchestra Hall. The work was Chopin's Concerto in F Minor (Op. 21). This was followed in 1947 by his professional debut at Kimball Hall (Chicago) and, in 1948, by a return to Orchestra Hall for a solo recital and an engagement with the Chicago Symphony Orchestra. During the early fifties Faith concertized as a recital accompanist for both singers and instrumentalists in programs that included his own compositions.

Faith's first instructor in composition was Max Wald, with whom he worked from 1947 to 1949. In the Fall of 1954 he began doctoral work in composition at Indiana University in Bloomington with Bernhard Heiden. Two years later Faith received his first full-time teaching appointment at Morningside College in Sioux City, Iowa. Although he was devoted to teaching piano, his great love for composition continued to flourish. In 1960 he went to Rome as a Fulbright Scholar, studying both piano and composition with Guido Agosti at the Accademia Nazionale di Santa Cecilia. He chose Italy because of his interest in Italian history and its early Renaissance art. He also was seeking the "clarity of Italian musical expression."

Faith spent the greatest part of his life at the University of Arizona in Tucson, where he assumed the position of Assistant Professor of Music (Piano) in 1961. He remained at the school until 1988, with an interim year at Morningside College in 1968. Many of his most popular compositions are the fruits of his tenure at Arizona: songs, choral works, piano concertos, orchestral and chamber works and opera.

Faith's first published work was the "Legend for Piano," printed by Summy-Birchard in 1967. Shawnee Press began publishing his compositions in 1968, followed by G. Schirmer Inc. in 1971 and Belwin Mills in 1974. In the late 1970s Faith's music achieved significant recognition with performances in London, Washington, D.C., and Tucson, and commercial recordings were released. From 1982 to 1988 he received annual awards from the American Society of Composers, Authors and Publishers (ASCAP).

Following his retirement from teaching in 1988, Richard Faith relocated from Tucson a number of times. Ever the itinerant musician, he was not content to settle in one place for very long. To freely quote the Yeats poem that he eventually set to music, Faith can be described as a "wandering Aengus"  with a "fire in his head."  He lived in Reston, Va., in California, Bloomington, In., returning to his home town of Evansville in the late 1990s, and in Denver. In 2015 he made his home in Savoy, Illinois where he gave piano recitals at his independent retirement community and continued to compose up until two weeks before his death. During the last 30 years performances, publications, dissertations and recordings of his works have flourished. His vast musical output includes over 60 chamber works, 21 choral arrangements, 4 operas, 16 orchestral pieces, 61 keyboard works and over 120 songs, including an unofficial contribution to the AIDS Quilt Songbook with his "Winter Journey," with poetry by William Lavonis. Faith's musical works and documents are being housed at the Fred Fox School of Music in the College of Fine Arts at the University of Arizona-Tucson. 

Richard Faith died at his home on February 28, 2021 in Savoy twenty days shy of his 95th birthday.

Musical style and songs
Faith's music displays a freely modulating harmonic language within the boundaries of tonality that combines neo-romantic and impressionistic qualities. With Debussy, Ravel, and Rachmaninoff as important influences on his music, and Brahms as a model with respect to form, Faith also shares musical traits with Vaughan Williams, particularly in the areas of modality and harmonic color and with Roger Quilter, the Victorian whose songs displayed a trait known as "decorous Romanticism." Faith's English flavor is even further highlighted by the composer's choice of poetry, much of which comes from English and Irish authors. Having developed a somewhat dry wit and an infectious, silly humor, Faith infrequently reflected these personality traits in his music, leaning more toward a sound that exudes a deep longing and romantic spirit.

Faith's song output spans the years 1944 to the present—his entire life as a composer. The over 120 settings run the stylistic gamut from sophisticated concert pieces to simple miniatures, duets, vocalises and selections with obbligato instruments, including flute, cello, viola and harp. His settings are generally for medium voice. Some have been written for specific singers to whom he has dedicated the music. Many of the songs are grouped according to subject matter, but are not necessarily musically connected. They may be sung as sets or separately, and may be transposed to suit the singer. Faith's tempo indications use traditional Italian terminology and the metronome markings are only suggestions. He is a gracious composer who allows individuals to develop their own interpretations of his music.

Because Faith himself is a pianist, many of the songs have sophisticated accompaniments. Sometimes the piano doubles the voice, though hardly ever through an entire piece. At other times the piano will play a countermelody to the voice to form a kind of obbligato. Like Debussy, Faith has a fondness for triplets, because of the movement and flow they add to a song. Thomas Nashe's "Spring, the Sweet Spring" (1950) is an exercise in perpetual motion for the accompanist, with only brief repose at the end of each stanza. This inventive, florid accompaniment, along with Faith's strict use of ABA form, thin texture, and a definite key signature (G) lend a neo-baroque character to this Elizabethan poem. The harmony, however, remains contemporary, with Faith's use of incidental chromatics and added-note chords.

Like many composers who rely on modality rather than tonality, Faith rarely uses key signatures. His harmonic idiom displays a changing palette of colors marked by simultaneous cross-relations, the Lydian sharped fourth, and combinations of this sharped fourth and Mixolydian flatted seventh. Faith has denied any desire to pursue more avant-garde idioms. Earlier experiments in progressive styles met with little success, and if anything beyond the romantic exists in Faith's music, it may be the influence of Hindemith which was furthered by his studies at Indiana University with Bernhard Heiden, himself a Hindemith pupil. Traces of this influence can be discerned in the appearance of quartal/quintal harmony in many of the songs. This is seen in "The Blackbird" by the Victorian author William Ernest Henley composed in 1955. The accompaniment begins with broken ninth and tenth intervals supported by mildly dissonant chords; it is then followed by a hocket-like passage. This underlying texture continues through the first half of the song, contrasting with legato vocal melody.

Faith's use of arch form or "coming full circle" reflects the influence of Brahms, whose many songs fall into this structural category. He may end with a literal repeat, a transposed portion, or only a fragment of A, and may repeat text, music, or both in the process. Arch form is also reflected in the use of dynamics. Many songs begin quietly, reach a climax in an interior section, and then end as they began.

The composer's selection of poetry brings to the foreground some of literature's most famous writers in works that in this day and age have been unjustly neglected by the general public: Conrad Aiken, Edward Lear, Charles Cotton, and Christina Rossetti, to name a few. In his later years Faith began to set more diverse poets, including Moorish, Islamic and Chinese authors. That Faith is well-read is apparent not only in his choice of fine poetry to set to music, but also in his allusions to literature in many of his instrumental works. In addition, he often selects longer poems than would be considered usual for a song and writes few miniatures. The success of setting a lengthy piece of verse seems to depend upon Faith's ability to delay the listener's climactic expectations by moving through harmonic ambiguity until reaching an emotionally charged section that merits a cadence—usually on open sonorities without the thirds. This event may repeat itself many times with a greater or lesser dynamic level, thereby expanding his music resources.

Faith's songs adhere strictly to the rhythm dictated by the text of the poem. In fact, he simultaneously composes both melody and accompaniment by singing the text and playing the keyboard and immediately writing it down. Faith's adherence to the text rhythm results in shifting meters to accommodate phrases of varying length and text-derived rhythmic figures often provide the basis for his accompaniments

For subject matter Faith prefers nature imagery over love poetry and until 1994 with his Mother Goose Rhymes, there had been only one comical song—Edward Lear's "The Owl and the Pussycat," written in 1960. Many of Faith's settings reflect the nationality of the poet and the time period in which the poem was written. For example, Four Love Songs on Elizabethan lyrics (1982) display thin textures, balanced forms, and traditional harmonic progressions, while the Jean de La Ville de Mirmont :fr:Jean de La Ville de Mirmont songs have a French character that reveals Faith's debt to Ravel and Debussy. More recently, Faith's songs on Moorish poetry evoke an exotic, middle eastern quality. In the beautiful setting of Ben Jonson's "To Celia" (commonly known as "Drink to Me Only with Thine Eyes"), Faith, by stressing the poem's inherent passion, brings a fresh outlook to a lyric which had become too familiar in arrangements of the old English setting. He achieves this through an operatically conceived vocal line: high and sustained, and encompassing a range of an octave and a fifth.

Two works that do not necessarily fall into specific stylistic categories, but deserve mention nonetheless, are Percy Bysshe Shelley's "Music When Soft Voices Die" and the miniature "Remember Me" by the Victorian Christina Rossetti. The spontaneous quality of the Shelley song reveals the poem's great effect on Faith, who, after nearly two years without song writing (1957), produced one of his most frequently performed pieces. The introduction's angular, twisting melody, taken later by the vocal line, lends a troubled, unsettling quality to the lyric. "Remember Me" was written in 1954 and is unusual for its brevity. The poet, Christina Rossetti, was an Englishwoman of Italian descent and is best known for her words to the hymns "In the Bleak Mid-Winter" and "Love Came Down at Christmas." Faith set three more of her poems which are included in the first published volume of songs by Leyerle Publications.

Many of Faith's songs have themes related to the sea, and there are a number of others in which the sea figures as an integral element in the poem. This stems from the composer"s extreme fascination with water, having been raised near the high banks of the wide Ohio River in Evansville, Indiana. "Sea Fever" (John Masefield), one of Faith's few biographically-influenced songs, displays such a depth of emotion rare for a nineteen-year-old. It is an important early song because it established many compositional techniques to which the composer returned throughout his lyrical output. Another "sea" example is "Ships" an English translation of "Vaisseaux, nous vous aurons aimés" by Jean de la Ville de Mirmont :fr:Jean de La Ville de Mirmont, the  French World War I poet killed in action in 1914. This poem was also set by Fauré in that composer's final song cycle L'horizon chimérique. Faith's song is scored for cello obbligato, piano, and female voice.

Faith skillfully translates into music the emotions behind the words of the world's greatest authors. Although many of his songs display common characteristics, each reveals an approach that allows the poem's individuality to shine through. Performers of art song, both singers and pianists, will appreciate Faith's output, considering the variety of poems he set to music and the gracious way he treats the voice and piano in his neo-romantic/impressionistic manner. Somewhat reticent of theoretical discussions, however, Faith considers himself only to be a composer of the heart, who relies on his musical gifts to bring joy to others.

Selected works

Chamber and instrumental music
 Air, for saxophone and piano
 Andante and Allegro, for bassoon and piano, 2011*
 Chant and Movement, for viola and piano, 2002*
 Concerto for Clarinet and Piano, 1989; Southern Music Co.
 Concerto for Two Pianos and Percussion
 Doric Dances, for cor anglais (or alto saxophone) and piano, 2000
 Elegy, for clarinet and piano, 1950*
 Elegy, for clarinet choir
 Essays, for oboe and piano, 1964
 Evocation, for trombone and piano, arr. from "Music I Heard With You", 1987*
 Evocations, for trumpet (Bb or C) and piano, 2006
 Fables, for viola and piano, 1974*
 Fantasy, for violin and piano
 Fantasy Trio No. 1, for violin, clarinet or oboe and piano, 1982
 Fantasy Trio No. 2, for violin, clarinet and piano, 1988
 Four Duets, for violin and cello
 Harvest Song, for baritone and woodwind quintet
 Highland Sketches, for baritone saxophone and piano, 2011*
 Incantations, for soprano, viola and piano, 1994
 Miniatures, for clarinet and piano, 1992; Belwin Mills
 Miniatures, for oboe and piano, 1988; Belwin Mills
 Moorish Dances, for violin, percussion and piano, 2002
 Movements, for horn and piano, 1966; Shawnee Press
 Oboe Concerto, 1982
 Pastorale, for cor anglais (or alto saxophone) and piano, 2000
 Phantasies, for saxophone and piano, 1985
 Poems, for cello and piano (based on Four Faith Songs), 1984
 Quintet for Flute, Clarinet, Violin, Cello and Harp, 1956
 Rhapsody for Cello and Piano, 1960*
 Rhapsody for Flute and Piano, 2007
 Rhapsody for Violin and Piano in Four Movements, 1954-55*
 Romance, for violin and piano, 1952*
 Second Fantasy Trio, for violin, clarinet and piano, 1995
 Sextet for Wind Quintet and Piano, 2001
 The Solitary Reaper, for baritone and woodwind quintet
 Sonata for Cello and Piano, 1985
 Sonata for Flute and Piano, 1957
 Sonata for Trumpet and Piano, 1957
 Sonata No. 2 for Trumpet and Piano, 1985
 Sonata for Viola and Piano
 Sonata for Violin and Piano, 1948*
 String Quartet, 1955*
 Suite for Bassoon and Piano, 1989; Southern Music Co.
 Suite for Clarinet and Piano, 2007
 Three Duets for Violin and Viola
 Three Nocturnes for Violin and Piano, 1970*
 Three Pieces for Oboe and Piano
 Trio for Flute, Cello and Harp, 1984
 Trio for Oboe, Bassoon and Piano, 2003
 Trio for Violin, Cello and Piano, 1965
 Trio for Violin, Horn and Piano
 Two Pieces for Brass
 Two Poems, for voice, violin, cello and piano (Mirmont), arr. 2010
 Two Romances, for violin and piano
 Two Songs, for violin and piano, 2000*
 Two Sea Pieces, for clarinet and piano, 1966
 Various pieces for clarinet and piano (Air, Eventide, Harlequin, Serenade), 1987*
 Woodwind Quintet
* unpublished

Choral
 All Day I Hear the Noise of Waters, for SSA and piano (James Joyce), 1966
 The Blackbird, for SATB and piano (William Ernest Henley), 1965
 Creation, cantata for soloists and SSATBB, 1993
 Daffodils, for SSA and piano (William Wordsworth), 1970
 God Be in my Head, for SATB and piano, 1990
 Hymn of Praise, for SATB and piano or organ, 1989
 Indian Summer, for SATB and piano (Wilfred Campbell), 1964
 Kyrie, for SATB and string orchestra (organ version), 1990
 Mass (Missa Hominum), for SATB, soloists and piano,1986
 Music I Heard With You, for SATB and piano (Conrad Aiken), 1968; G. Schirmer
 O Spirit of the Summertime, for SATB and piano or string quartet (William Allingham), 1970
 On the Isle of Skye, for TTBB (Richard Faith), 1986
 Remember Me, various vocal arrangements (Christina Rossetti), 2003, 2006
 Sea Fever, for TBB and piano (John Masefield) 1965; for SATB and piano, 1980
 Sleep Child, from The Little Match Girl, for SATB and piano (Michael Ard), 1994
 Sonnet 54, for TTBB (William Shakespeare), 1986
 Spring, the Sweet Spring, for TTBB (Thomas Nashe), 1986
 Though I Speak, for SATB and piano (St. Paul), 1991
 The Waters of Babylon, cantata in 4 movements, for baritone solo, SATB chorus and piano (Jeremiah, Isaiah), 1976
 The Wayfarer, for SATB and violin, viola, cello, horn and piano (Rainer Maria Rilke), 1996
 What Sweeter Music, for SATB and piano (Robert Herrick), 1993

Opera
 Beauty and the Beast, 3 acts, for piano, orchestra or small chamber orchestra (Michael Ard), 1992
 The Little Match Girl, 1 act, for piano or chamber orchestra (Michael Ard), 1979; orchestration 1990-91
 Sleeping Beauty, 2 acts, for piano or orchestra (Michael Ard), 1970
 The Wydah's Gold, 5 scenes, for piano or chamber orchestra (Robert Weller), 1997

Orchestra
 Aureole, 1981
 Concert Overture, 1988
 Concerto for Clarinet and Chamber Orchestra
 Concerto No. 1 for Piano and Orchestra, 1969; kermitpeters.net
 Concerto No. 2 for Piano and Orchestra, 1975; chamber arrangement, 1998
 Concerto No. 3 for Piano and Orchestra, 1982
 Concerto for Clarinet and Chamber Orchestra, 1987
 Elegy, 1966
 Festivals, 1980; originally Concerto for Two Pianos, 1972
 Idylls, for oboe and chamber orchestra, 1982
 Lydian Overture, 1984
 Odyssey, 1965
 A Pastoral Overture, 1964
 Phantasie, for piano and orchestra, 1977
 Processional, for string orchestra, 1994
 Sonata No. 1 for piano; orchestrated 1995

Piano and organ
 Allegheny Serenade, for two pianos, 1998*
 Andante and Allegro for Two Pianos, 1998*
 Arabesques, 2000*
 Carousels, 1991; Belwin Mills
 Carousels, for two pianos, 1972*
 Celebration
 Concerto for Two Pianos, 1973-74; Shawnee Press, Hal Leonard
 Dance Suite, for 4 hands, 1990
 Dances, 1977; Shawnee Press, Hal Leonard
 Differencias, 1969*
 Elegy, for organ (arr. of "Elegy for Orchestra"), 1991*
 Etude "Stratification", 1984
 Family Portraits, 2006
 Fantasy No. 1, 1968*
 Fantasy No. 2, 1987; Shawnee Press
 Finger Paintings, 1966; Shawnee Press, Hal Leonard
 Five Preludes and a Nocturne, 1967; Shawnee Press
 Floating
 Four Cameos, 1971; Shawnee Press
 Four Timbres, 2009
 Gaelic Suite, 1993*
 Gallantries, 2009
 The Highwayman
 Islands, 1970, 1985; Shawnee Press
 Le Mont Saint Michel, 2008*
 Legend, 1967; Summy Birchard
 Little Preludes, 1966*
 Masquerades, 1988; Belwin Mills
 Moments in a Child's World, 1968; Shawnee Press
 Night Piece
 Nocturne, 1975
 Pastoral Suite, 1989, revised 2009; Shawnee Press
 Piano Concerto No. 1, 1969
 Piano Concerto No. 2, 1975
 Piano Concerto No. 3, 1982
 Performance Practices in Late 20th-Century Piano; Alfred Publishing Co.
 Piano Transcriptions of Songs, 2005-10*
 Pipes, 1987; Belwin Mills
 Recollections. Nine Short Pieces, 1969, 1974; Shawnee Press
 Rhapsody, 1980*
 Russian Folk Tales, 1990; Belwin Mills
 Service Sonata, for organ, 1970*
 Six Preludes and a Nocturne
 Skandian Suite, 2008
 Sketches, 1987; Belwin Mills
 Sonata No. 1, 1962, revised 2010
 Sonata No. 2, 1957
 Sonata No. 3, 1958
 Sonatina, 1987
 Sonatina, 1987; Belwin Mills
 Souvenir from 12 by 11, 1979; Alfred Publishing Co.
 Suite "Trouveres", for harpsichord, 2002*
 Tableaux, 4 hands 1987; Belwin Mills
 Three Etudes, 1978, revised 2009
 Three for Two, for two pianos 1998*
 Three Night Songs, 1964, 1980, 2010
 Three Sonatinas
 Toccata "The Dark Riders", 1969; Shawnee Press
 Travels, 1970; Shawnee
 Two Nocturnes, 1976
 Voyages, 2001*
 Woodland Adventures, 1988*
* unpublished

Songs
(published by Leyerle Publications  unless otherwise indicated)

 Noon (Robinson Jeffers), 1944-45; revised 2004*
 Sea Fever (John Masefield), 1945
 Music I Heard With You (Conrad Aiken), 1946-47
 Granite (Lew Sarett), 1948*
 She Weeps Over Rahoon (James Joyce), 1950*
 Dark Hills (Edward Arlington Robinson), 1950
 Spring, the Sweet Spring (Thomas Nashe), 1950-51
 Tumultuous Moment (Lew Sarett), 1951*
 Desire in Spring (Francis Ledwidge), 1952
 Evening (Rupert Brooke), 1952*
 To Helen (Edgar Allan Poe), 1953
 Remember Me (Christina Rossetti), 1954
 The Blackbird (William Ernest Henley), 1955
 Music When Soft Voices Die (Percy Bysshe Shelley), 1957
 Dry Spell (Lizzi Morrison), 1957*
 River Roses (D.H. Lawrence), 1958*
 Dover Beach (Matthew Arnold), 1958
 In the Evening of Inhabiting Mists (Linda Joy), 1959*
 Spring (Jack Wertz), 1960*
 The Owl and the Pussy-Cat (Edward Lear), 1960
 Bobby Shafto (Mother Goose), 1961
 Laura Sleeping (Charles Cotton), 1962
 Hymn of Praise (The Jewish Union Prayerbook), 1962
 The Sun has Set (Emily Brontë), 1964-65
 The Solitary Reaper with flute and piano (William Wordsworth), 1966
 Harvest Song with flute and piano (Joseph Campbell (poet)), 1967*
 Caterpillar (Lillian Vaneda), 1967; revised in 1992 as Firefly (June Presswood)
 Night Piece (Joseph Campbell (poet)), 1970*
 The River (Patrick MacDonogh), 1971, revised 2009*
 On the Isle of Skye (Richard Faith), 1973
 I have Embarked, for voice, cello (and violin) and piano;(Jean de la Ville Mirmont :fr:Jean de La Ville de Mirmont; trans. by Martha Belen), 1975
 Chant with cello and piano (vocalise), 1976
 It is a Beauteous Evening (William Wordsworth), 1976
 The Lake Isle of Innisfree (William Butler Yeats), 1980
 The Wild Swans at Coole (William Butler Yeats), 1981
 The Wind Blows Out of the Gates of the Day (William Butler Yeats), 1981
 To Celia (Drink to me only with thine eyes, Ben Jonson after Philostratus), 1982
 He Remembers Forgotten Beauty (William Butler Yeats), 1982; Classical Vocal Reprints
 O, the Month of May (Thomas Dekker (writer)), 1982
 Sonnet 54 (O, how much more does beauty beauteous seem, William Shakespeare), 1982
 In the Land of Sleeping Seeds for two high voices (Mary Stigers), 1982*
 It was a Lover and his Lass (William Shakespeare), 1982
 The Song of Wandering Aengus (William Butler Yeats), 1982
 I Hear the Shadowy Horses (William Butler Yeats), 1982
 If I Were (poet unknown), 1982
 Ships for voice, cello (and violin) and piano (Jean de la Ville Mirmont :fr:Jean de La Ville de Mirmont; trans. by Martha Belen), 1983
 Stanzas Written in Dejection near Naples (Percy Bysshe Shelley), 1984*
 Flight (James Wood), 1984*
 Why Must I Go (James Wood), 1984*
 Perhaps (James Wood), 1984*
 Though I Speak (Corinthians I, 13, St. Paul), 1985*
 Annabel Lee (Edgar Allan Poe), 1985
 The Passionate Shepherd to his Love (Christopher Marlowe), 1985
 Serenade (anon. medieval Latin; trans. by Helen Waddell), 1985
 Sonnet 116 (Let me not to the marriage of true minds, William Shakespeare), 1986*
 The City in the Sea (Edgar Allan Poe), 1989
 To Jane or The Keen Stars were Twinkling (Percy Bysshe Shelley), 1989
 Echo (Christina Rossetti), 1991
 Spring Quiet (Christina Rossetti), 1991
 No Music in the Wind (Lou Anna Thomas), 1991*
 My Heart is like a Singing Bird (Christina Rossetti), 1992
 Scenes from Macbeth  for Soprano, Baritone and Piano (William Shakespeare), 1992*
 Apollo and Daphne for Mezzo, Baritone and Piano (Richard Faith), 1992*
 Return of Spring ( trans. by L. Cranmer Byng), 1992
 Absence (Abū Bakr al-Turushi; trans. by Cola Franzen), 1993*
 Serene Evening (Muhammad ibn Ghālib al-Rusāfi; trans. by Cola Franzen), 1993*
 Split my Heart (Ibn Hazm; trans. by Cola Franzen), 1993*
 Leavetaking (Ibn Jakh; trans. by Cola Franzen), 1993*
 Oh, Fateful Night (Ibn Safr al-Marīnī; trans. by Cola Franzen), 1993*
 Winter Journey (William Lavonis), 1993
 All Day I Hear the Noise of Waters (James Joyce), 1993*
 To Chloris (Sir Charles Sedley, 5th Baronet), 1993*
 Where are you going to, my pretty maid? (Mother Goose), 1994
 Jenny Wren (Mother Goose), 1994
 I saw three ships (Mother Goose), 1994
 The Queen of Hearts (Mother Goose), 1994
 God Be in My Head (Sarum Primer), 1994
 What Sweeter Music (Robert Herrick), 1994
 So all day long the noise of battle rolled (Alfred, Lord Tennyson), 1994*
 Crossing the Bar (Alfred, Lord Tennyson), 1994
 Wisdom is Sweeter than Honey (Makeda, Queen of Sheba), 1994; publ.as INCANTATIONS, Musik Fabrik, France
 Come, my Beloved (Song of Songs: The Shulammite), 1994; publ.as INCANTATIONS, Musik Fabrik, France
 I Bind you by Oath (A Roman Spell), 1994; publ.as INCANTATIONS, Musik Fabrik, France
 I Cannot Dance, O Lord (Mechtild of Magdeburg), 1994; publ.as INCANTATIONS, Musik Fabrik, France
 So, we'll go no more a roving, duet for tenor and baritone (Lord Byron), 1995; Classical Vocal Reprints
 The Isles of Greece (Lord Byron), 1995
 A Sailor's Song (Audrey Weinreis), 1995
 The Isle of Pines (Po chü-i trans. by L. Cranmer Byng), 1995
 Time does not bring relief (Edna St. Vincent Millay), 1995*
 To a Waterfowl (William Cullen Bryant), 1996
 The Death of a Conqueror (Jared Freedeen), 1996*
 Though the Way be Dark (Carl A. Dallinger), 1996
 Autumn Memories (Carl A. Dallinger), 1996
 A Moment in Time (Carl A. Dallinger), 1997
 Old Mother Goose (Mother Goose), 1997
 My Mother Said (Mother Goose), 1997
 Sing a Song of Sixpence (Mother Goose), 1997
 Old Woman, Old Woman (Mother Goose), 1997
 Love is not all (Edna St. Vincent Millay), 1998*
 And you as well must die, beloved dust (Edna St. Vincent Millay), 1998*
 Low Moon Land (Francis Ledwidge), 1998*
 Apollo and Daphne for Mezzo, Baritone and Piano  (Richard Faith), 2000*
 Water (Michael Ard), 2000; revised 2010; Classical Vocal Reprints
 The Stolen Child (William Butler Yeats), 2001; Classical Vocal Reprints
 Prelude (John Millington Synge), 2001*
 Vocalise, 2001*
 Fire (Michael Ard), 2001; revised 2010; Classical Vocal Reprints
 Air (Michael Ard), 2002; revised 2010; Classical Vocal Reprints
 Earth (Michael Ard), 2002; revised 2010; Classical Vocal Reprints
 The Dead Poet, duet for tenor and baritone (Lord Alfred Douglas), 2002*
 O Spirit of the Summertime for High Voice, Cello and Piano (William Allingham), 2003*
 At the Mid Hour of Night (Thomas Moore), 2005*
 Sudden Light (Dante Gabriel Rossetti), 2005*
 The Fiddler of Dooney (William Butler Yeats), 2007; Classical Vocal Reprints
 Verses from Lamentations (Jeremiah), 2007*
 Sonnet 104 (William Shakespeare), 2007*
 Drifting (Li Po (Li Bai) trans. by L. Cranmer Byng), 2009*
 The Rose of Tralee (William Pembroke Mulchinock), 2009*
 Echoes: Two Songs in One (John Todhunter, Thomas Moore), 2010*
 Poems from the Voices of Gaia (Michael Ard), 2010; Classical Vocal Reprints
 The Ancient Wind (Po chü-i trans. by L. Cranmer Byng), 2010*
 Sonnet 116, new setting (William Shakespeare), 2011; Classical Vocal Reprints
 There Will Be Rest (Sara Teasdale); for Karen Krueger, 2011; Classical Vocal Reprints
 On first looking into Chapman's Homer (John Keats), 2012 Classical Vocal Reprints
 Much have I travell'd in realms of gold (John Keats), 2014*
 From House of Dust, duet for tenor and baritone (Conrad Potter Aiken), 2014*
* unpublished

Discography
 Incantations & Rhymes: Music for Soprano, Viola, and Piano. Karen Peeler, soprano; Henrietta Neeley, viola; Robin Guy, piano. Superdups, Tewksbury, MA.
 Music I heard With You — David Jimerson Sings Songs of Richard Faith
 Remember Me: Songs by Richard Faith. Lesley Manring, soprano; Julie Simson, mezzo-soprano; William Lavonis, tenor; Kurt Ollmann, baritone; Elizabeth Rodgers, piano; Richard Faith, piano. eDream Studios, Milwaukee, WI.
 Remember Me: Songs by Richard Faith. Brenda Baker, soprano; Richard Faith, piano.
 Rhapsody-Chamber Music of Richard Faith
 Songs of Love and Longing, Valerie Errante, soprano
 The Songs of Richard Faith. Joseph Hopkins, baritone; Richard Faith, piano. Hopkins Recording Company
 Incantations and Rhymes. Trio Ariana
 The Ensemble da Camera of Washington. Fantasy Trio for Violin, Clarinet and Piano
 New Works for Bassoon. Suite for Bassoon and Piano
 The Catalina Chamber Orchestra. Concerto for Clarinet and Chamber Orchestra

Further reading
 ASCAP Biographical Dictionary, 4th ed. (New York: Jaques Cattell Press, 1980).
 Anderson, Ruth: Contemporary American Composers. A Biographical Dictionary, 2nd ed. (Boston: G. K. Hall & Co., 1982).
 Kimball, Carol: Song. A Guide to Art Song Style and Literature (Wisconsin: Hal Leonard Corporation, 2006).

References

1926 births
2021 deaths
20th-century American male musicians
20th-century American pianists
21st-century American male musicians
21st-century American pianists
21st-century classical pianists
American classical composers
American classical pianists
American male classical pianists
American male classical composers
Piano pedagogues
People from Evansville, Indiana